The Chittisinghpura massacre refers to the mass murder of 35 villagers of the Sikh faith that was carried out, by unknown gunmen in Indian Army Uniforms, on 20 March 2000 in the Chittisinghpora (Chittisinghpura) village of Anantnag district, Jammu and Kashmir, India on the eve of President Bill Clinton's state visit to India.

The identity of the perpetrators remains unknown. The Indian government asserts that the massacre was conducted by Pakistan-based militant group Lashkar-e-Taiba (LeT). Other accounts accuse the Indian Army of the massacre.

Killings

Wearing Indian Army fatigues, the killers arrived into the village in military vehicles in two groups at separate ends of the village where the two gurdwaras were located, while the villagers had been celebrating the Hola Mahalla festival. They ordered them to line up in front of the gurdwaras and opened fire, killing thirty-five people.

Aftermath 
The massacre was a turning point in the Kashmir issue, where Sikhs had usually been spared from militant violence.

Shortly after the massacre, hundreds of Kashmiri Sikhs gathered in Jammu, shouting anti Pakistan and anti Muslim slogans, criticising the Indian government for failing to protect the villagers, and demanding retaliation.

Following the killing, Syeed Salahudeen, Pakistan-based leader of the largest Kashmiri militant group Hizbul-Mujahideen, denounced the massacre, accusing India of it, and assured the Kashmiri Sikh community of the militants' support.

Anantnag killings 
Five days after the killings, Indian Army troops stopped and killed five people in the village of Pathribal near Anantnag, claiming they were Pakistani perpetrators of the massacre. Soon, however, reports surfaced that they were all local villagers. After a public outcry, the government ordered genetic identification of the victims in order to show that they were not related to local families. However, the tissue samples sent by the government to a genetic laboratory in Hyderabad turned out fake. A subsequent public inquiry revealed that the victims of the Indian Army killings were all random people with no relation with the Chittisinghpura massacre.

Perpetrators
Survivors interviewed by journalists insisted that the perpetrators had looked and spoken "like people from South India" and had shouted pro-India slogans after the massacre. According to Lt-General KS Gill, "[Indian] army officers up to the rank of a captain were involved in the 'fake encounter'. They kept visiting Chhatisinghpura for routine 'checkups'. After obtaining full information about the Sikh, they lined them up and shot them dead one day."

In 2000, Indian authorities announced that Mohammad Suhail Malik, a nephew of Lashkar-e-Taiba co-founder Hafiz Muhammad Saeed, confessed while in Indian custody to participating in the attacks at the direction of Lashkar-e-Taiba. He repeated the claim in an interview with Barry Bearak of The New York Times while still in Indian custody, although Bearak questioned the authenticity of the confession. In 2011, a Delhi court cleared Malik of the charges.

In an introduction to a book written by Madeleine Albright titled The Mighty and the Almighty: Reflections on America, God, and World Affairs (2006), Hillary Clinton accused "Hindu Militants" of perpetrating the act. This created a major incident, with both Hindu and Sikh groups expressing outrage. Clinton's office did not return calls seeking comment or clarification. The publishers, HarperCollins, later acknowledged "a failure in the fact-checking process" but did not offer a retraction.

In 2010, the Lashkar-e-Taiba associate David Headley, who was arrested in connection with the 2008 Mumbai attacks, reportedly told the National Investigation Agency that the LeT carried out the Chittisinghpura massacre. He is said to have identified an LeT militant named Muzzamil as part of the group which carried out the killings apparently to create communal tension just before Clinton's visit.

In 2005, Sikh organizations headed by the Bhai Kanahiya Jee Nishkam Seva Society demanded a deeper state inquiry into the details of the massacre and for the inquiry to be made public. The state government ordered an inquiry into the massacre.

References

History of Sikhism
March 2000 events in India
Mass shootings in India
Massacres in Jammu and Kashmir
Massacres of Sikhs
Massacres of men
Mass murder in 2000
Massacres in 2000
Religiously motivated violence in India
Terrorist incidents in India in 2000
Violence against men in Asia
20th-century mass murder in India
2000 in India